Fasemabad-e Hajji (also Romanized as Fāsemābād-e Ḩājjī) is a village in Qasemabad Rural District, in the Central District of Rafsanjan County, Kerman Province, Iran. At the 2006 census, its population was 2,737, in 671 families.

References 

Populated places in Rafsanjan County